Yarrawonga Weir Power Station is a hydroelectric power station at Lake Mulwala on the Murray River, Victoria, Australia.

It is a run-of-the-river generator with two Kaplan turbines each with capacity to generate 4.75 MW. It was commissioned in 1994 and connects to the Victorian electricity grid at 22 kV.

References

Energy infrastructure completed in 1994
Hydroelectric power stations in Victoria (Australia)